The 2006–07 Danish Cup was the 53rd version of the Danish Cup. The tournament was won by Odense Boldklub who defeated F.C. Copenhagen at May 17 in Parken Stadium. It was OB's fifth title of the tournament.

The winner qualified for UEFA Cup qualification.

Fixtures and results
The team listed to the left, is the home team.

First round
In first round competed 50 teams from the "series" (Denmark's series and lower 2005), 26 teams from Danish 2nd Divisions 2005-06 and 12 teams from Danish 1st Division 2005-06 (no. 5 to 16).

The draw was held on June 29, 2006

West

North

Central

South

East

Second round
In second round competed 44 winning teams from first round, 4 teams from Danish 1st Division 2005-06 (no. 1 to 4) and 8 teams from Danish Superliga 2005-06 (no. 5 to 12).

The draw were held on August 10, 2006.

Third round
In third round compete 28 winning teams from second round and 4 teams from Danish Superliga 2005-06 (no. 1 to 4).

The draw were held on August 24, 2006.

Fourth round
The draw were held on September 21, 2006.

Quarter finals
The draw were held on November 9, 2006.

Semi finals
The semi finals will be played on home and away basis.

The draw were held on April 13, 2007.

Final

The final were played at Parken Stadium.

See also
 Football in Denmark
 2006-07 in Danish football
 Danish Superliga 2006-07
 Danish 1st Division 2006-07
 Danish 2nd Divisions 2006-07 - East, West

External links
 The Danish FA's full match schedule.

Danish Cup
Cup
Danish Cup seasons